Fleming Glacier is a broad glacier  long on the west side of the Antarctic Peninsula, flowing west-northwest and terminating in Forster Ice Piedmont to the east of the Wordie Ice Shelf. The glacier was charted by the British Graham Land Expedition (BGLE) under John Rymill, 1934–37, and was photographed from the air by the United States Antarctic Service on September 29, 1940. This hitherto unnamed feature was named by the Advisory Committee on Antarctic Names in 1947 for Reverend W.L.S. Fleming, Dean of Trinity Hall, Cambridge University; also, chaplain, chief scientist, and geologist of the BGLE.

Further reading 
 Wendt, A.; Wendt, J.; Bown, F.; Rivera, A.; Zamora, R.; Bravo, C.; Casassa, G., Ice flow velocities and elevation change at Fleming Glacier, Wordie Ice Shelf, Antarctic Peninsula, EGU General Assembly 2009, held 19-24 April, 2009 in Vienna, Austria http://meetings.copernicus.org/egu2009, p.11788 
 Mauri Pelto, Ongoing Evolution of Fleming Glacier, Antarctica, OCTOBER 31, 2019

External links 

 Fleming Glacier on USGS website
 Fleming Glacier on SCAR website
 Fleming Glacier image on NASA website
 Fleming Glacier on mindat.org

References 

Glaciers of Palmer Land